Deep Fried Peanuts are a snack food created by deep frying peanuts in an oil. The resulting product is a snack food that can be eaten in its entirety, both shell and nut.  The deep-frying process does not change the flavor or texture of the nutmeats, but changes the texture and flavor of the shells—especially if seasonings are used—to make them more palatable.

Shell and all

Variations of the phrase 'shell and all' are commonly used to market deep fried peanuts, for example: A Little Nuts Deep Fried Peanuts, www.deepfriedpeanut.com, Go-N-Nuts  WildDry Uncle Bud's Deep Fried Peanuts and Mike's Peanuts. The Peanut Trading Company,

See also
 List of peanut dishes
 List of legume dishes

References

Peanut dishes
Peanuts